Kent Johnson (born October 18, 2002) is a Canadian professional ice hockey forward currently playing for the Columbus Blue Jackets of the National Hockey League (NHL). He played college ice hockey for the University of Michigan. He was drafted fifth overall by the Blue Jackets in the 2021 NHL Entry Draft.

Playing career

Junior
During the 2018–19 season in his first season with the Trail Smoke Eaters of the British Columbia Hockey League (BCHL), Johnson recorded 20 goals and 26 points in 57 games. During the 2019–20 season, he recorded 41 goals and 60 assists in 52 games and won the Brett Hull Trophy as the league's leading scorer. Following an outstanding season, he was named BCHL First-Team All-Star, BCHL Most Sportsmanlike Player, BCHL Most Valuable Player, and Canadian Junior Hockey League Forward of the Year.

Collegiate
Johnson began his collegiate career for the Michigan Wolverines during the 2020–21 season. On January 8, 2021, Johnson recorded a career-high five points in a game against Michigan State. He became the first Michigan player to record five points in a game since J. T. Compher on March 18, 2016. He was subsequently named the Big Ten Conference First Star of the Week for the week ending January 13, 2021. He finished his freshman season with nine goals and 18 assists in 26 games. He ranked second in rookie scoring in the Big Ten Conference and third in the nation in rookie points per game. Following the season, he was named to the All-Big Ten Freshman Team. 

During the 2021–22 season in his sophomore year, he recorded eight goals and 29 assists in 32 games. He finished fourth in the nation in assists per game and ranked 16th in points per game.

Professional
On July 23, 2021, Johnson was drafted in the first round, fifth overall, by the Columbus Blue Jackets in the 2021 NHL Entry Draft. On April 8, 2022, Johnson signed a three-year, entry-level contract with the Blue Jackets. He made his NHL debut on April 13, 2022, in a game against the Montreal Canadiens. He finished the 2021–22 season with three assists in nine games. Johnson scored his first career NHL goal on October 22, 2022, against Tristan Jarry of the Pittsburgh Penguins.

International play

On July 21, 2021, Johnson was selected to attend Canada's National Junior Team summer development camp. On January 25, 2022, Johnson was named to Team Canada's roster as an alternate to represent Canada at the 2022 Winter Olympics. He recorded one goal and four assists in five games during the tournament. 

On May 9, 2022, Johnson was named to Canada's roster to compete at the 2022 IIHF World Championship. When he scored a goal in Canada's Group A first preliminary round game, he became the fourth player in history to score at least one goal at the World Juniors, Olympics, and Worlds in the same season. The others to accomplish this feat were Saku Koivu (1993–94), Evgeni Malkin (2005–06), and Eeli Tolvanen (2017–18). He recorded four goals and three assists in ten games and won a silver medal.

He represented Canada at the 2022 World Junior Ice Hockey Championships, where he recorded three goals and six assists in seven games. He scored the game-winning overtime goal to help Canada win gold.

Personal life
Johnson was born to Jay and Anita Johnson. He has Finnish roots as his mother Anita is originally from Finland and moved to Vancouver at the age of two. Kent, however, does not speak Finnish. His brother, Kyle, plays hockey for Yale.

Career statistics

Regular season and playoffs

International

Awards and honours

References

External links
 

2002 births
Living people
Columbus Blue Jackets draft picks
Columbus Blue Jackets players
Ice hockey people from British Columbia
Michigan Wolverines men's ice hockey players
National Hockey League first-round draft picks
People from Port Moody
Trail Smoke Eaters players
Ice hockey players at the 2022 Winter Olympics
Olympic ice hockey players of Canada